Dixie Technical College (Dixie Tech) is a public technical college in St. George, Utah. It is part of the statewide Utah System of Higher Education. Dixie Tech was established in 2001 by the Utah State Legislature and offers certificate programs accredited by the Council on Occupational Education. The college is also an American Heart Association Training Center.

History
Dixie Tech was established on September 1, 2001, by the Utah State Legislature. It relocated to its current campus on St. George's Tech Ridge in 2018. Before that year, it was called Dixie Applied Technology College or DXATC, but that was changed when all institutions of the now defunct Utah System of Technical Colleges took on "Technical College" in their names. In 2020, the Utah System of Technical Colleges was subsumed into the Utah System of Higher Education.

External links
 Official website

References

Educational institutions established in 2001
2001 establishments in Utah
Buildings and structures in St. George, Utah
Utah College of Applied Technology Colleges
Education in Washington County, Utah
Educational institutions accredited by the Council on Occupational Education